Beibis Antonio Mendoza (born 20 June 1974) is a Colombian professional boxer. He is a former WBA light-flyweight champion.

Amateur career 
Mendoza was a member of the 1996 Colombian Olympic Team as a Light Flyweight. His results were:
Defeated Domenic Figliomeni (Canada) 12-1
Lost to Oleg Kiryukhin (Ukraine) 6-18

Professional career 
Mendoza turned professional in 1996 and captured the vacant WBA light flyweight title with a DQ win in 2000 over Rosendo Alvarez. In the fight Alvarez suffered two point deductions and was eventually disqualified for low blows by referee Mitch Halpern, who committed suicide 8 days after the fight.

Professional boxing record

External links 
 

  

1974 births
Boxers at the 1996 Summer Olympics
Light-flyweight boxers
Living people
Olympic boxers of Colombia
World Boxing Association champions
World light-flyweight boxing champions
World boxing champions
Sportspeople from Antioquia Department
Colombian male boxers
20th-century Colombian people